Kommineni (Telugu: కొమ్మినేని) is an Indian surname. Notable people with the surname include:

 Kommineni Apparao, better known as Chakravarthy, Telugu film music director.
 Kommineni Seshagiri Rao, famous Telugu film director.
 Sri Kommineni born as Kommineni Srinivasa Chakravarthi was an Indian film composer.

Indian surnames